Haun Creek is a stream in the U.S. state of Kansas. It is a tributary to the Neosho River.

Haun Creek was named after Reverend A. Haun, a pioneer citizen.

References

Rivers of Kansas
Rivers of Morris County, Kansas